Transgender youth are children or adolescents who do not identify with the sex they were assigned at birth. Because transgender youth are usually dependent on their parents for care, shelter, financial support, and other needs, transgender youth face different challenges compared to adults. According to the World Professional Association for Transgender Health, the American Psychological Association, and the American Academy of Pediatrics, appropriate care for transgender youth may include supportive mental health care, social transition, and puberty blockers, which delay puberty and the development of secondary sex characteristics to give children time to make decisions about more permanent courses of action. In Europe, some medical groups and countries have discouraged or limited the use of puberty blockers.

According to the American Academy of Pediatrics, "by age four most children have a stable sense of their gender identity" and "research substantiates that children who are prepubertal and assert [a transgender or gender diverse identity] know their gender as clearly and as consistently as their developmentally equivalent peers who identify as cisgender and benefit from the same level of social acceptance". A review published in 2022 found the majority of pre-pubertal children who socially transition persist in their identity in 5 to 7 year follow ups.

Persistence of transgender identity 

If gender dysphoria persists during puberty, it is very likely permanent. For children with gender dysphoria, the period between 10 and 13 years is crucial with regard to long-term gender identity. Factors that are associated with gender dysphoria persisting through puberty include intensity of gender dysphoria, amount of cross-gendered behavior, and verbal identification with the desired/experienced gender (i.e. stating that they are a different gender rather than wish to be a different gender). Prospective studies have reported that gender dysphoria in children is more heavily linked to adult homosexuality than to an adult transgender identity, especially with regard to boys. The studies state that the majority of children diagnosed with gender dysphoria did not desire to be the other sex by puberty, with most growing up to identify as gay, lesbian, or bisexual, with or without therapeutic intervention. The studies have been used to argue for more caution or delays in socially or medically transitioning transgender youth.
 
The prospective studies have been criticized as irrelevant on the basis that they counted as 'desistance' cases where the child was simply gender-nonconforming rather than dysphoric and tracked diagnoses rather than gender identity or desire to transition, leading to inflation of the desistance statistics. The majority of desistance research relies on four studies published since 2008. While the subjects met the criteria for gender identity disorder as defined in the DSM-III or DSM-IV, many would not have met the updated criteria for gender dysphoria in the DSM-5, established in 2013, which unlike prior versions explicitly requires identification with a gender other than assigned at birth. In one study, 40% of those classified as "desisters" were subthreshold even for the DSM-IV criteria. The four studies all offered evidence that statement of transgender identity in childhood predicted transgender identity in adolescence and adulthood and the intensity of gender dysphoria in childhood likewise predicted its intensity later in life. The studies published from the 1960-1980's never used the term desistance, instead focusing on "gender-deviant behavior" - childhood femininity in people assigned male at birth - and how this more often predicts homosexuality rather than "transsexualism" in adulthood. Additionally, some of the research since 2000 and all the research prior has been criticized for citing studies that used conversion therapy: either discouraging social transition, explicitly trying to prevent or discourage the child from identifying as transgender as an adult by adulthood or adolescence, or actively employing techniques to limit there "gender-deviant" behavior. The term "desistance" itself has been criticized as pathologizing for its roots in criminal research and oppositional defiance disorder, where desistance is considered a positive outcome.

A systematic review of research relating to desistance was published in 2022. It found that desistance was poorly defined: studies sometimes didn't define it or equally defined it as desistance of transgender identity or desistance of gender dysphoria. They also found none of the definitions allowed for dynamic or nonbinary gender identities and the majority of articles published were editorial pieces. They stated the concept was based on biased research from the 1960-80s and poor quality research in the 2000s. They concluded there was a "dearth of high-quality hypothesis-driven research that currently exists" on the subject, and suggested that desistance should "be removed from clinical and research discourse to focus instead on supporting [transgender and gender-expansive] youth rather than attempting to predict their future gender identity." According to a review published in 2022 considering more recent studies, the majority of pre-pubertal children who socially transition persist in their identity in 5 to 7 year follow ups.

Coming out

Transgender youth may encounter family exclusion and face discrimination. Some transgender youth feel that they need to remain closeted until they feel that it is safe and appropriate to come out and reveal their gender identity to their family members, and friends. In the LGBT community, to "come out" means to acknowledge one's sexual identity or gender identity and make it known to the public.

Family acceptance 

Family acceptance or lack thereof has a significant impact on the lives of transgender youth. It may be impossible to predict a parent's reaction to the news of their child's gender identity and the process can be fraught for many transgender youths. In some cases, parents will react negatively to such news, and may disown the child or kick the youth out of the home. Current research suggests that transgender youth who have been entered into the juvenile justice system are more likely to have experienced family rejection, abuse, and abandonment compared to those youth who are not transgender. Because transgender youth depend on their parents for support and acceptance, family exclusion can result in them becoming emotionally vulnerable and regretting their decision to come out. Parents can find gender-affirmative counsellors and doctors and connect their children with LGBTQ support groups. Many parents join organizations such as Mermaids in the UK and PFLAG in the US so they can meet other parents and learn how to advocate for their children. Additionally, reactions of parents to transgender children can change over time. For example, parents who initially reacted with negativity and hostility may eventually come around to support their transgender children.

Support 
Research has overwhelmingly indicated that familial support and acceptance of transgender youth has resulted in more positive life outcomes for the individual regarding their mental, physical, and emotional health.

Studies have indicated a number of ways that parents or guardians of transgender youth can show support and acceptance for their child with one of them being the opportunity for the child to speak about their gender identity. Transgender youth have found greater success and emotional stability when parents took on a supportive role rather than a controlling and dismissive stance. Troubleshooting problems during the transition as they arise, rather than pushing views on the child and dictating their process has allowed for healthier transitions. Additionally, informing professionals and other critical individuals in the child's life aides in developing a support network for the transgender youth.

Parents access to information is critical in aiding and advocating for transgender youth. Access to information supports parents in providing youth with resources regarding their gender identity such as medical care, counselling, educational literature, and local youth groups that can provide access to others in the transgender community.

Support in school is also important to the wellbeing and mental health of trans youth. Many schools seek to support trans pupils and educators can look to a variety of trans inclusion school guidance documents to shape their support of trans pupils of all ages and the literature continues to consider best practice within the educational setting.

Health risks 
Family acceptance of transgender youth predicts an increase in greater self-esteem, social support, and general health status. It also protects against depression, substance abuse, and suicidal ideation and behaviors. As recent as 2015, research has shown that in carefully selected patients, people who transition young suffer few ill effects, and maintain a higher level of functioning than before transitioning. Additionally, results of treatment such as counselling are considered better when it is offered at an earlier age.

Family behaviors can increase or decrease health risks of transgender youth. Behaviors such as physical or verbal harassment, pressure to conform to gender norms, and excluding the youth from family events, will lead to higher health risks such as depression and suicide. On the positive end, behaviors such as supporting the youth's gender identity by talking about it and working to support their choice even though the parent might be uncomfortable make a significant impact on boosting the youth's confidence, which works to combat health risks associated with rejection.

Medical interventions 

Puberty blockers are sometimes prescribed to trans children who have not yet begun puberty to temporarily halt the development of secondary sex characteristics. Puberty blockers allow patients more time to solidify their gender identity before starting puberty. While few studies have examined the effects of puberty blockers for transgender and gender non-conforming adolescents, the studies that have been conducted generally indicate that these treatments are reasonably safe and can improve psychological well-being. 

Short-term side effects of puberty blockers include headaches, fatigue, insomnia, muscle aches and changes in breast tissue, mood, and weight. The potential risks of pubertal suppression in gender dysphoric youth treated with GnRH agonists may include adverse effects on bone mineralization. Additionally, genital tissue in transgender women may not be optimal for potential vaginoplasty later in life due to underdevelopment of the penis. Research on the long term effects on brain development, cognitive function, fertility, and sexual function is limited. In the Netherlands, youth are allowed to begin cross sex hormones at age 16, following their course of puberty blockers.

Some studies support the rights of children to provide informed consent to puberty blockers, saying that if parents are unjustly opposed to a child's transition, the child would have no recourse for needed treatment, drawing parallels to the right of children of Jehovah's Witnesses to blood transfusions, in addition to pointing to psychological benefits from access to blockers and intense psychological and physical harm that can come from lack of access. Trans minors, especially homeless trans youth, without standard access to blockers may seek them from unreliable sources leading to dangerous side effects. Trans youth have also spoken out in support of their right to blockers.

In Bell v Tavistock, the High Court of Justice of England and Wales ruled that it was unlikely that a child under the age of 16 could be Gillick competent to consent to puberty blocking treatment. This was overturned by the court of appeal, which ruled that children under 16 could consent to receive puberty blockers.

For those who are above age 18 and do not require parental consent, there are several medical interventions available. For those wishing to transition from male to female, options consist of facial feminisation surgery, vaginoplasty, breast augmentation surgery, and cross-sex hormones. For those wishing to transition from female to male, options consist of penile construction surgery, breast reduction surgery, and cross-sex hormones. Under American Psychiatric Association criteria, in order for any individual to receive these medical treatments, they must have a written diagnosis of gender dysphoria and have undergone up to a year's worth of therapy. If they are a citizen of Malta, there is a quick and relatively simple paperwork process to change their gender marker. In contrast, the United States has a difficult and extensive process that requires medical proof of need and returning to your home state to obtain various legal documents. In the United States to change an individual's existing gender marker and name, visits must be made to change the driver's license, social security card, banking documents, and passport. The State of New York will soon be allowing the administration of Medicaid coverage for the distribution of hormones to transgender teens and youth.

Vulnerability
Transgender youth are extremely vulnerable to a multitude of problems, including substance use disorders, suicide, childhood abuse, sexual abuse/assault, and psychiatric disorders.

Gender dysphoria

Gender dysphoria is a strong, persistent discomfort and distress with one's gender, anatomy, birth sex, and even societal attitudes toward their gender variance. Transgender youth who experience gender dysphoria tend to be very conscious of their body; appearance, weight, and other people's opinions of their body may become very important. A part of gender dysphoria is gender incongruence, which is the disconnect between gender and sex. Incongruence, in its most basic form, is the emotional and/or mental part of dysphoria.

Physical, sexual, and verbal abuse
Transgender and gender nonconforming youth are at an increased risk for physical, verbal, and sexual abuse. Childhood gender noncomformity is correlated with abuse, and parental abuse due to noncomformity is correlated with worse mental health outcomes such as increased risk of depression and suicide. Body esteem issues in terms of appearance were standard between suicidal and non-suicidal trans youth, but those who had more esteem issues about weight or other people's dislike of their bodies are at increased risk of suicide. Parental support was identified as an important factor in reducing adverse health affects. One transgender youth in a focus group recounted "When my mother, who is a PhD, found out what I was (i.e., transgender), she used to hurt me with things. She hit me on the head with an iron once, and I had five staples. Finally, she disowned me." At the end of the focus groups, many of the youth stated "There is nothing for transgender youth. Please help us." Youth who have parental support of their gender identity and preferred gender presentation are much more likely to be better off in several ways: mentally, financially, academically, etc. Transgender youth who face physical abuse may be forced to leave their homes, or choose to leave, which can be a particularly traumatic experience. The lack of housing was found to often lead to financial difficulties for such youth. Lack of support at home and constant harassment at school may lead to academic difficulties for the youth as well, who face a much higher drop out level compared to their cisgender counterparts.

Homelessness and survival sex 
In the US, according to the National Healthcare for the Homeless Council, one-fifth of LGBT youth have unstable housing or lack housing altogether, as of 2014. As a result, it is estimated that between 20 and 40% of homeless youth are a part of the LGBT population. Reasons for LGBT youth not being able to have stable housing include family rejection/conflict, varying forms of violence, and difficulty within various institutions such as school or the foster care system. Even when LGBT youth find themselves in homeless shelters, they are not having their needs met, leaving them at disproportionate rates on the streets compared to their heterosexual and cisgender peers, who fit within the gendered housing they are given and do not require additional services in their shelter placement.

One practice that results from transgender youth's inability to attain appropriate shelter is survival sex, the act of engaging in sexual activity with another individual in order to meet one's basic survival needs. One multi-city study found that about one in four homeless and runaway youth has engaged in survival sex. Sex is typically exchanged for money, but may also be exchanged for a bed for the night, food, or clothing. While there is an awareness of the possible dangers associated with survival sex, some youth who engage in the practice may derive a sense of pride in being able to support oneself through it. Risks associated with survival sex include the transmission of STI/STDs (sexually transmitted infection/disease).

Lack of access to healthcare 
Transgender youth face many hardships in obtaining medical treatment for gender dysphoria. This lack of access is often due to doctors refusing to treat youth, or youth fearing negative reactions from health care providers. Psychiatrists, endocrinologists and family physicians now have clear guidelines on how to provide care to trans youth of early puberty through its completion. These are in wide use in Europe, UK, and in North America. While in other countries, doctors may be generally reluctant to provide hormone therapy to youths under 16, and obtaining sex reassignment surgery prior to the age of 18 is almost impossible in most countries. Some of the medical professionals who are permitted to prescribe hormones include medical providers, nurse practitioners, and physician assistants.

Many youth who have used hormones to develop desired secondary male or female sex characteristics have obtained these hormones illicitly. This can result in a multitude of health problems for the youth, including improper pubertal growth and HIV due to contaminated needles. Sexually transmitted infections are a large health problem for transgender teens as well, as sexual partners often do not perceive these youth as health risks, especially since male-to-female youth cannot become pregnant. This trend of unprotected sex among the transgender population puts them at increased risk and has led to higher numbers of STIs among the group. However, version 7 of the Standards of Care for the Health of Transsexual, Transgender, and Gender Nonconforming People has addressed the needs of transgender children.

Bullying
School settings can be some of the toughest for transgender youth. Several problems may be faced at schools, including verbal and physical harassment and assault, sexual harassment, social exclusion and isolation, and other interpersonal problems with peers. Transgender students were much more likely than their peers to report harassment, assault, and feeling unsafe in school settings. These experiences vary between individuals and schools attended. Larger schools tend to have safer climates for transgender students, as do schools with more low income and religious and ethnic minorities.

In the United States, a 2009 study of 6th through 12th grade transgender students showed that most experienced a hostile school climate with regular harassment from peers. 82% of these youth reported that they felt unsafe at school because of their gender identity, and almost 90% reported experiencing homophobic harassment from peers frequently. A majority of these students also reported physical harassment at school, with nearly half reporting that they had been punched, kicked, or injured with a weapon. Sexual harassment among these students was also reported with alarming frequency (76%). Restrooms and locker rooms pose an especially high threat to transgender students. They frequently reported fear and anxiety about using these facilities at school because of experiences of harassment by both peers and adults when using them. Negative comments about gender presentation may be frequently overheard in these places, and surveyed students have reported being "pushed around," "getting the crap beat out of them," and "getting their asses kicked" by peers. A 2017 study of U.S. students in grades 9–12 found that 27% of transgender students reported feeling unsafe at school, a sharp contrast with only 5% of cisgender boys and 7% of cisgender girls who reported similar feelings.

School administrations often do not take reports of victimisation of transgender students seriously. Only a third of transgender students who reported victimization to school staff members feel that their situation was taken care of adequately and effectively. The other two thirds often run into situations where the school staff members blame the victimized students. One student, when reporting bullying, said that they were told "that I need to stop flaunting my sexuality". School administrations often single out transgender students and discipline them for behaviour such as wearing appropriate clothes for their gender identity, using restrooms consistent with their gender identity, and insisting on using their preferred name and personal pronouns. These things serve no educational purpose and only isolate transgender students further.

High drop out rates and low grade point averages seem to plague the transgender population. The severity and frequency of bullying and harassment are directly correlated to these things. In one study of transgender youth, three quarters of the participants dropped out of school, almost all citing the main reason the constant acts of violence against them due to their gender identity. Anti-transgender bullying in schools has also been found to directly correlate with other negative outcomes, such as homelessness, unemployment, incarceration, and drug use.

Suicide 
Though several studies that estimate life-threatening behavior for gay, lesbian, and bisexual youth have been done, few have been done regarding transgender youth, and thus comparable estimates do not exist. The few studies that have been done, however, have all concluded that transgender youth are at increased risk even over their gay, lesbian, and bisexual counterparts. A 2007 study of transgender youth found that, of the youth interviewed, about half had seriously contemplated ending their own lives. Of those who had thought about suicide, about half had actually made an attempt. Overall, 18% of all interviewed transgender teenagers reported an attempted suicide that was linked to their transgender identity. A similar study was conducted with gay, lesbian, and bisexual youth, with results showing 15% had made a suicide attempt that was due at least partly to their sexual orientation. Both of these numbers are higher than the 8.5% of high school population overall who had reported life-threatening behavior. In a recent study, it is found that these statistics are even higher for those who are homeless or have been rejected from receiving medical care due to their gender identity; this brings the numbers up to 69% with a general statistic stating that around 40% of transgender youth have attempted suicide. In the 2011 National Transgender Discrimination Survey, which surveyed 6,450 transgender individuals, 41% of respondents reported attempting suicide compared to 1.6% of the general population (a rate 25 times more elevated). Reported rates of attempted suicide were even higher for those who were unemployed, experienced harassment and physical or sexual abuse, or low household income.

Youth are generally predisposed to life-threatening behaviors due to a number of conditions, such as self-hatred, victimisation via bullying, substance abuse, etc. Transgender youth may also face victimization from peers and family members’ negative reactions to their atypical gender presentation, increasing their risk of life-threatening behaviors. Awareness of the suicide rates of LGBT youth spiked post-2010, as a result of significant publicity being given to the suicides of Leelah Alcorn, Skylar Lee, and Ash Haffner only being a few.

Critics such as Andrew Gilligan have claimed that figures for youth transgender suicide are grossly exaggerated by transgender groups. Gilligan in particular has claimed that rates in the United Kingdom are less than 1%. Numerous studies, though, across various countries, have noted suicide attempt rates for transgender children ranging from 30 to 50%, at least double the rates of age-matched cisgender peers.

Court experiences 
Individuals involved in the juvenile justice system have reported that transgender youth have an exceptionally difficult experience. This is because transgender youth are in a vulnerable stage and unlike cisgender or LGBQIA youth, a sentence to a juvenile detention facility could mean that their transition is stopped while they are detained. That is damaging to their mental health, and an experience that other youth are not subjected to.

Juvenile justice professionals are bound to the rules of ethics to ensure all youth are treated fairly. However, many transgender youth felt as if they were not adequately represented or respected in court. This included treatment from prosecutors, court-appointed defense attorneys, and judges, whether it is ignoring the appropriate pronouns, or in one case a judge refusing to hear the case of one transgender girl due to the way she was dressed. Judges are supposed to refrain from prejudice and biases while maintaining that attorneys abide by those same guidelines as well.

Prosecutors are required to ensure that all individuals are treated fairly and are not discriminated against. In one case, a prosecutor requested confinement for a transgender defendant rather than being returned home. The judge agreed to the sentence, even though they did not seem suicidal, dangerous, or appear to be a flight risk. An additional problem for some transgender youth is having an effective and zealous defense. Some report having had a defense attorney who went directly against their client's wishes due to his or her own personal beliefs. In some cases, the defense attorneys told the courts to leave transgender individuals in places from which they wanted to be removed, because those youths felt those places were unsafe due to lack of support and acceptance.

Detention centers 
After court sentencing, youth are placed in detention centers where they are processed and assigned their placements within the facility. During intake, the goal is to address safety concerns of the youth, identify those who are vulnerable, and then house juveniles based upon their birth gender. Regardless of placements, transgender youth are targets for violence, and about eighty percent of individuals surveyed reported that the lack of safety in facilities as a serious concern. The survey of youth confined made no distinction between transgender and LGB youth, as their experiences are similar. Furthermore, the placement of LGBTQ youth is a complicated issue because their wants and needs have to be balanced with what is best for their safety.

In most facilities, youth are detained with their birth sex. Detainees are sometimes forced to alter their gender presentation (e.g. by cutting their hair). Medical experts state that this process can put transgender youth in distress and undermine their emotional stability. In contrast, juvenile detention center staff claim that this process is in the best interest for transgender youth and for their peers in the center because it decreases the opportunity for physical and sexual violence.

In a 2009 survey, some detentions centers stated that they already had difficulties with housing girls and boys on the same campus, and mixing in transgender youth according to their chosen gender in one dormitory would only create more problems. Transgender (female-to-male) boys are harder to place because of the high level of violence in the boy's facilities, and the high risk of sexual assault. One trans boy surveyed expressed concern about his safety in male units, saying "I’m not going to be ignorant...I know how males are."

As a result of these difficulties, transgender youth are frequently placed in solitary confinement. The centers assert that the solitary confinement is for their safety because the facilities cannot keep them protected if they are mixed in with the general population. However, confinement strips them of any recreational and educational programming that is imperative to maintaining mental stability. Oftentimes these isolations are based on beliefs that LGBTQ youth are sexual predators, and should not be around other confined youth, or with individuals of the opposite gender. One transgender youth in New York was placed in isolation for three weeks, despite her request to be placed in general population. Following her isolation, she was placed in observation for three months, whereas others are only in observation for one week.

Additionally, the safety of detention facilities is a primary issue as reported from LGBT youth in detention centers and individuals who work in the juvenile justice system. Transgender youth are at risk for abuse from both staff and other youth in the center. This can include staff abusing the youth or ignoring incidents of rape and abuse. Youth who were interviewed stated that they feared for their safety, and complaints about abuse went unheard and unresolved.

Staff members in juvenile detention centers are not properly trained in order to deal with some of the issues faced by transgender youth, such as use of proper pronouns or adequate clothing choices. This can be due to the varying amount of comfort around the issue of transgender youth and sexual identification, which has an impact on the treatment the youth receive. For example, one transgender girl stated that she did not have problems with the boys in her detention center, but she did with the staff. She said the staff would call her "him" and "he," even though she identified as female, and they refused to accept her transition from male to female.

Accommodation in schools
A national survey conducted by GLSEN found that 75% of transgender youth feel unsafe at school, and those who are able to persevere have significantly lower GPAs and are more likely to miss school out of concern for their safety. These students also reported to be less likely to plan on continuing their education as a result to their unsafe environment.

In recent years, some transgender children have received counseling and, in some cases, medical treatment for their condition, as well as the ability to change their gender identity. In some countries, schools are working to accommodate gender identity and expression by eliminating traditional gendered activities.

A safe school climate is essential for transgender, gender dysphoric, and gender non-conforming children, who likely experience stress and anxiety due to their desire to transition or display themselves as a different gender. While many schools have become more accepting and allow children to express their desired gender identity, current research shows that there is an increased amount of harassment, bullying, indifference by school staff, and antigay victimization towards transgender and gender non-conforming youth. Also, many schools may not allow children to use the bathroom of their choice. Other schools may enforce LGBTQ-related policies and implement necessary staff trainings to minimize these social hazards for transgender and gender non-conforming children. To accommodate the transgender students, In July 2018, 40 schools in UK banned skirts to make school uniform gender neutral.

Families with a transgender child living within an intolerant community may face challenging issues. Gwen Araujo of Newark, California, was a young person who was living as female, when she had been assigned to the male gender at birth. When her trans status was revealed at a party she attended, she became the victim of violent crimes that resulted in her death.

Many transgender students feel as if they must hide their true identity when entering the school environment. A major part of why transgender people may feel this way is because school administrators as well as the general non-LGBTQ student population are not provided with the necessary knowledge required to help support their transgender peers.

Societal and legal attitudes 
On a global scale, transgender individuals face varying levels of acceptance or denial based on their location's attitude towards the LGBT community. Factors that influence acceptance or denial of their identity tend to surround political interests, religious affiliations, and whether their identity is still labeled as a mental health disorder. Acceptance levels tend to predominantly be higher in countries located in the Global North. Despite higher levels, acceptance rates still vary from country to country, Malta and the United States of America are two examples of countries where legislation and the social acceptance levels have curated a safer environment for transgender individuals.

Malta 
In early April 2015, Malta adopted a bill titled the "Gender Identity, Gender Expression and Sex Characteristics Act" (GIGESC Bill). The bill allows minors to have their parents apply to have their legal gender marker changed for them or to have a gender marker held from their birth certificate until their gender identity has been self-determined. The bill also prevents surgeries from being performed on intersex infants until their gender identity has been discovered; the parents are no longer required to make an immediate decision and medical personnel cannot override this decision because the bill also outlaws the request to view medical records. For individuals who are no longer a minor, they only need to request a notary for self-declaration, again the individual cannot be asked for medical records when changing their legal gender or performing any other legal changes in conjunction to their gender identity. Also, the entire process can be completed in less than thirty days. In order to continue Malta's progress in LGBT protections and rights, the government has set up a council called the LGBTIQ Consultative Council, this action shows their commitment and dedication to actually enforcing the Bill. While there are other European countries who have created allowances and encouraged acceptance of transgender individuals, most require compulsory sterilization and have lengthy legal proceedings.

Mexico 
In Mexico City, transgender teenagers over the age of 12 may change their legal gender as of August 27, 2021. In Jalisco, following a decree on October 29, 2020, trans children and teenagers from all Mexican states were able to change their legal gender with parental consent, but since the implementation of new legislation in April 2022, recognition of transgender identities has been limited to people over the age of 18. In Oaxaca State, transgender teenagers over the age of 12 may change their legal gender as of October 2021.

United States 
Discrimination in the United States is considered illegal. Many transgender youth face struggles in attempting to transition and to be accepted in the U.S. According to the Human Rights Campaign, as of 2015, in 32 states an individual can be fired for being transgender and in 33 states an individual can be refused housing. Transgender people are also disproportionately targeted for hate crimes. One report studying data from 1995 to 1999 found that 20% of transgender people who were murdered were victims of anti-transgender hate crimes. Anti-transgender violence also caused 40% of police reports by the transgender population. In 2013, the state of California signed a bill in to legislation titled the School Success and Opportunity Act giving transgender students the full rights and opportunities that their cisgender peers are granted. For individuals who are minors, if their parents consent, they are able to begin receiving puberty blockers at a young age and later receive cross sex hormones and then transitional surgeries upon turning 18 years of age. For those who are not minors, they are able to participate in any body altering transitional experience that they desire if they are able to financially afford it and after going through a year of therapy to affirm this decision, but will have to jump over several hurdles for it to also be legally marked. The western and northeastern states are currently the most tolerant of the transgender population and have the most laws to protect those individuals.

During the first 4 months of 2021, there was a wave of legislation aiming to restrict access to gender-affirming healthcare treatments to transgender youth, as 28 Republican-controlled state legislatures have drafted or passed a number of bills of this sort. In April, Arkansas passed the Save Adolescents From Experimentation (SAFE) Act, which banned medical treatment and procedures for transgender youth under the age of 18. The law warns health care providers that administering procedures such as puberty-blockers, cross-sex hormone therapy, and gender-affirming surgeries can result in losing their medical license. Colorado, Florida, Illinois, Kentucky, Missouri, Oklahoma, South Carolina, South Dakota, and West Virginia have proposed similar laws that would prevent trans youth from having access to gender-affirming health care. Opponents of the bills criminalizing transition-related treatment for transgender youth are concerned that it prevents doctors from following health care guidelines approved by organizations like the American Medical Association.

On May 10, 2021, the Biden administration announced that it would provide transgender people protection against discrimination in health care, in an effort to restore civil rights protections for LGBTQ people that were eliminated by his predecessor. The policy reestablished that the federal government will protect transgender people, once again prohibiting discrimination on the basis of sexual orientation and gender identity by health care providers and health-related organizations who receive federal funding.

Health and Human Services’ (HHS) reversal of Affordable Care Act, Section 1557 was backed up by landmark Supreme Court decision Bostock v. Clayton County (2020) that ruled that LGBTQ individuals are protected against employment discrimination on the basis of their gender identity or sexual orientation. HHS concludes that the Bostock decision applies to health care as well, which led to the revising of the ACA civil rights provision. HHS Secretary Xavier Becerra said in a statement: “The Supreme Court has made clear that people have a right not to be discriminated against on the basis of sex and receive equal treatment under the law, no matter their gender identity or sexual orientation. Fear of discrimination can lead individuals to forgo care, which can have serious negative health consequences”.

On April 7, 2022, the Alabama legislature passed HB 322, which bans transgender youth from using sex-segregated school facilities aligning with their gender and prohibits discussion of sexual orientation and gender identity in grades K-5, copying language from a recent Florida bill. A few hours later they passed SB 184, which criminalizes the provision of gender-affirming medical care for transgender minors, making it a felony punishable by up to 10 years in prison to help - or suggest - a child medically or socially transition and mandating that school employees report a child's gender identity to their parents. The bill makes exceptions for intersex youth and circumcision. During the debate, its sponsor, Rep. Shay Shelnutt, compared gender-affirming care to vaping or getting a tattoo. The Southern Poverty Law Center, GLBTQ Legal Advocates & Defenders, and the Human Rights Campaign announced plans to challenge the bill, on behalf of medical best practices as supported by most major American medical associations, two medical care providers, and the families who would be harmed by the bill.

Transgender youth activists

 Eli Erlick (b. 1995), American trans activist
 Aimee Challenor (b. 1997), British politician and transgender activist
 Jazz Jennings (b. 2000), American activist and television personality
Lily Madigan (b. 1998), British activist, and first openly transgender woman to become a Women's Officer within the Labour Party
 Nicole Maines (b. 1997), American actress and transgender rights activist, plays the first television transgender superhero on CW's Supergirl

Media representations
The film Ma Vie en Rose (My Life in Pink) (1997) by Alain Berliner follows a young child named Ludovic who is assigned male but who lives as a girl and tries to make others agree with her identification. Ludovic's "gender play" incurs conflict within the family and prejudice from the neighbors.

The film Tomboy (2011) by Céline Sciamma follows a 10-year-old with the given name Laure who, after moving to a new neighborhood, dresses as a boy and adopts the name Mikäel.

The 2015 Documentary film Louis Theroux: Transgender Kids follows documentarian Louis Theroux's exploration of the burgeoning transgender youth therapy community in San Francisco, California. He interviews several transgender youth as they engage in medical, social, and psychological therapies to conform to their desired gender identities.

See also

 Gender dysphoria in children
 Healthcare and the LGBT community
 Homelessness among LGBT youth in the United States
 Transgender rights
 List of transgender-related topics
 List of transgender-rights organizations
 Suicide among LGBT youth
 Transphobia

References

External links
 If You Are Concerned About Your Child's Gender Behaviors: A Parent guide. A publication of Children's National Medical Center's Outreach Program for Children with Gender-Variant Behavior and Their Families
 ABC News: Understanding Transgender Children
 Transgender Community Questions & Answers With Johanna Olson, MD – CHLA's Transyouth Program

LGBT youth
youth